German humour is the conventions of comedy and its cultural meaning within the country of Germany. German humour encompasses traditions such as Kabarett and other forms of satire as well as more recent trends such as TV shows and stand-up comedy.

Germans distinguish between "Comedy" (using the English word) and "Komödie" (the German word of the same origin). "Comedy" refers to post-1990s TV-comedy, which is characterized by comedic entertainment in the form of stand-up comedy, stage shows, modern satire, cabaret and adaptations of foreign comedy concepts, including airing of foreign shows. "Komödie" refers to films and plays.

Culture 

German humour often follows many conventions which, due to similarities in cultural perception of events and day-to-day life (and other such universal themes which may be discussed through comedy), may be readily interpreted by natives of other countries.

Some German humorists such as Loriot used seriousness as a source of humour. Another notable example of mock-serious humour with satirical content is Jakob Maria Mierscheid MdB, a spoof politician, and his eponymous Mierscheid Law. He started the spoof as a hoax to falsify restaurant bills, but he has had enough pop culture recognition since the 1970s to gain his own (tongue-in-cheek) entry on the official Bundestag website. Similarly, the Stone louse (Petrophaga lorioti), a fictitious animal which was a part of a comic mockumentary video sketch, gained acknowledgement as a fictitious entry in the medical encyclopedic dictionary Pschyrembel Klinisches Wörterbuch.

However, current events, situations, traditions, and cultural factors which are unique to the country make it hard to understand the joke for someone who is not aware of the events being referred to. This applies especially to the widespread local dialects and customs in Germany. In other cases the humour derives from mixing different styles of speech or contrasting them with each other. For instance, the comedian Helge Schneider is renowned for his absurdist and anarchical humour, yet due to the deep roots of his humour in the German language and its several stylistic levels, much of his material is lost when translated into English.

Language 

German-language humour is, for linguistic reasons, constructed differently from English-language humour (e.g., British humour and American humour).

Nevertheless, in German there is a series of jokes based on multiple meanings of a word, for which English uses several different words. An example (from East German political humour) would be: {{blockquote|The train announcer at the main station was imprisoned!" – "Why?" – "He announced 'Please step back/resign!' as Erich Honecker's train was arriving!"; in German zurücktreten, bitte! can mean both please step back! and please resign!}}

However, German wordplay can also be based on compound words. German phonology often allows puns that are due to coda devoicing: for example, Leitkultur is pronounced exactly the same as Leidkultur (literally, culture of affliction). German grammar allows speakers to create new compound nouns and verbs with ease, and then split them, which requires a complete reordering of the sentence. Compounds often have a meaning that differs from the simple amalgamation of their components. These grammatical means exploited by German wordplay have no straightforward English equivalents. An example of grammatical means exploited by English wordplay relying upon phonology that becomes unintelligible in German is "Time flies like an arrow. Fruit flies like a peach." Here, the source of untranslatability is the multiple meanings in English of "fly" as both a verb and a noun and "like" : "to feel attraction for" versus "similar to".

In German nouns are always written with a capital letter, so there are also jokes about  this.

Examples:
 Der Gefangene floh – The prisoner escaped
 Der gefangene Floh – The captured flea
 Die Spinnen! – The Spiders
 Die spinnen! – They're crazy
 Er hatte liebe Genossen - He had dear comrades
 Er hatte Liebe genossen - He had enjoyed love
 In the GDR there were lots of jokes on the word play with Genossen / genossen

Non-German speakers may find it hard to understand German humour, simply due to the language barrier, as some jokes, puns and humorous turns of phrase are lost in translation.

, a German Kabarettist and writer, said: "Germans are unable to speak the German language". Commonly or apparently incorrect usage of German grammar is another form of humour ironically called Stilblüten (bloomers).

 Types of humour 
 Schadenfreude 
The word Schadenfreude can be translated as glee or spitefulness, but most often it doesn't serve a malicious purpose. A more fitting translation is "the fun of seeing others struggling". Often the protagonist of such jokes is thrown into a dilemma, where he or she has to ignore the German sense of suavity in order to get out of a specific situation.

In one sketch from well-known comedian Loriot, the protagonist tries to get rid of a banana skin. The whole scene utilizes no spoken words or dialogue.

 Literature and television 

The oldest popular forms of German comedy were the Posse and the Schwank which could take the forms of stories, plays or improvisations. The German comedic play (Lustspiel) was refined and updated by playwright and critic Gotthold Ephraim Lessing who, in Briefe, die neueste Literatur betreffend (1759) described the early 18th century comedies as relying heavily on dressed-up characters, magic tricks and fights. His comedy Minna von Barnhelm (1767) and Heinrich von Kleist's The Broken Jug (1811) joined especially various translations and adaptations of plays by early Greeks, Racine, Shakespeare, Molière, Calderon and others to form the basis of later developments.

The German Classical and Romantic periods saw a lot of humorous polemical, parodistic and satirical exchange between writers such as Goethe, Schiller, Ludwig Tieck, the Schlegel brothers, as well as many critics and philosophers both in the literary journals and in their own publications. Probably the most renowned ironic texts and poems in that era were written by Heinrich Heine, who developed a very distinct tongue-in-cheek style of writing, embracing Romantic ideals while mocking at the same time, often even within one poem. Up until today Heine remains to be titled one of the most insightful and witty among German writers.

One of the most important figures in the beginning of filmed comedy in Germany was stage comedian Karl Valentin who produced short films from 1912 to 1941.

 Common joke themes and forms 
 Jokes about other nationalities: Germans have their own set of stereotypes about other nations, as well as different regions in Germany. Scotsmen are portrayed as miserly, Swiss as physically slow, French as sophisticated lovers, Poles as notorious thieves, Dutch as slow/bad drivers on motorways (typically with a caravan attached to their car), and Chinese as employing caricatures of Confucian wisdom. An Austrian is usually merely an antagonist of a German character and may be presented as superior, inferior, or an unacknowledged equal.
Example: The United Nations initiated a poll with the request, "Please tell us your honest opinion about the lack of food in the rest of the world." The poll was a total failure. The Russians did not understand "Please". The Italians did not know the word "honest". The Chinese did not know what an "opinion" was. The Europeans did not know "lack", while the Africans did not know "food". Finally, the Americans didn't know anything about the "rest of the world".In some respects, the jokes try to be fair, for instance: Which nationality was Ötzi the Iceman? He wasn't Italian, as he carried tools; he wasn't Austrian, since he had brains; he might have been Swiss, since he was overtaken by a glacier, but most probably he was a North German, because nobody else walks in sandals in the mountains. East Frisians (Ostfriesen) (East Frisians are a people living in East Frisia, the north-western corner of Germany): This national minority is portrayed as absurdly stupid or naive. Jokes are often in the form of question and answer, both given by the joke-teller.

Example: How many Frisians does it take to screw in a light bulb? Five! One to hold the bulb and four to turn the table he's standing on.Example: What would you do in the event of the Great Flood? Go to East Frisia, because there everything happens fifty years later. Beamte: German state officials (Beamte). Within jokes, they are considered slow and lazy, doing a nearly useless job in the bureaucracy.

Example: Three in a room and one is working, what's that? – Two officials and a fan.Example: Three boys argue about whose father is the fastest. The first one says: "My father is a racing driver, he is the fastest." The second one contradicts him: "No, my father is a Luftwaffe pilot, surely the fastest one." "That's nothing", says the third one. "My father is a Beamter, he is so fast that when work ends at 5 pm, he's already home at 1 pm."Example: Visitor: "You have many flies in this office." - Beamter: "Yes, 247." Mantawitz (Manta joke): The male counterpart to the blonde is the Mantafahrer, the male driver of an Opel Manta, who is dull, lower class, macho, infatuated with his car and his blonde hairdresser girlfriend, and often exceedingly proud and possessive about things that most people would consider embarrassing. Popular in the 1990s, also the popularity of such jokes spawned two successful movies (Manta – Der Film and Manta, Manta, the latter starring Til Schweiger as the Mantafahrer).

Example: What does a Manta driver say to a tree after a crash? – "Why didn't you get out of my way, I used the horn!" Antiwitz (anti-joke): A short, often absurd scene, which has the recognizable structure of a joke, but is illogical or lacking a punch-line (an example of a non sequitur).

Example: Two thick feet are crossing the street. Says one thick foot to the other thick foot: "Hello!"Other examples: "Nachts ist es kälter als draußen" (At night it's colder than outside) or "Zu Fuß ist es kürzer als über'n Berg" ("Walking is faster than over the mountain") or "Zwei Männer gehen über eine Brücke. Der eine fällt ins Wasser, der andere heißt Helmut." ("Two men walk over a bridge. One falls into the water, the other is called Helmut.").

 Kalauer (literally translated as "pun"): Short, often deliberately clumsy puns and plays on words. Usually delivered in a Q&A scheme, e.g. "Which Peter makes the most noise? The Trum-Peter."

Examples: See "Kalauer" in the German-language Wikipedia Bauernregeln-Witze (Farmers' lore jokes): Told in the traditional rhyme scheme of weather lore. There are two variants: one is really about weather, but the rule is absurd or tautologous; the other can be about any other topic, makes some sense, often has sexual connotations, and may feature word play or some real, hidden or twisted wisdom.Wenn noch im November steht das Korn, dann isses wohl vergesse worn (If the corn still stands in November, then there is something the farmer didn't remember).Liegt der Bauer tot im Zimmer, lebt er nimmer (If a farmer lies dead in a room, he lives no more).Wenn der Bauer zum Waldrand hetzt, war das Plumpsklo schon besetzt (If a farmer rushes to the woods, the outhouse is occupied).

In fact, while many real Bauernregeln sound funny, they carry the grain of truth, so sometimes it is hard to tell, whether it is a parody or an ancient wisdom:Ists an Silvester hell und klar, dann ist am nächsten Tag Neujahr (If Sylvester is light and clear, the next day'll surely be New Year).Hört Waltraud nicht den Kuckuck schrein, dann muss er wohl erfroren sein ("If by Waltrude the cuckoo is not heard, it is probably frozen and dead.")
  April 19 is the feast day of Saint Waltrude, this wit alludes to the possibility of a snapback of cold in April

Scatological humour. Alan Dundes in his book Life Is Like a Chicken Coop Ladder: A Portrait of German Culture Through Folklore suggests that the prominence of scatological humour in German culture stems from the "Teutonic parents' overemphasis on cleanliness".

 Political satire in magazines 
Germany has a longstanding satirical tradition. From 1896 to 1944, the weekly magazine Simplicissimus (the German equivalent of Punch) made fun of politics and society (however, during the Gleichschaltung in Nazi Germany it was turned into a propaganda paper). Starting in the 1960s, the magazine Pardon continued the satirical tradition in West Germany. Later, the magazine 'Titanic' followed. In Socialist East Germany the satirical magazine Eulenspiegel was founded which within strict limits was allowed to make fun of grievances in the GDR. Eulenspiegel and Titanic still exist in today's Federal Republic of Germany. Titanic displays satire without boundaries, which is often directed against politicians and public figures and has been the subject of numerous legal cases in Germany. However, German law is very liberal when it comes to satirical freedom.  The same publication's practical jokes have also drawn some international attention: In 2000, a Titanic prank led to the award of the FIFA World Cup 2006 to Germany.
Political satire is also a popular theme for TV shows, Scheibenwischer (now called Satiregipfel) being one example.

 Kabarett 
Another tradition in Germany is political Kabarett, which is often seen as a special form of cabaret. Kabarett is dedicated almost completely to serious topics. Social critical Kabarett is often ambivalent between sadness and happiness, while the humour is some kind of key for controversial and critical messages. Its focus spreads from general political to very personal questions highlighting the individual being in social context and responsibility. Themes of modern Kabarett include social progress in the Berlin Republic, migration, education, reforms of the social systems, the mission of the Bundeswehr, development of the economy, ethics in politics and society and German reflexivity.

Especially in the former East Germany (where Kabarett stages were allowed in the larger cities) political Kabarett had some importance in opinion formation, although it had to be very careful and had to create some kind of ambiguous and ironic humour with hidden messages, to evade censorship.  East German Kabarett was tolerated as a control valve for political topics. Kabarett in West Germany dealt with taboos on political themes and broke with common opinions. An episode of Scheibenwischer in 1986 was censored on Bavarian television but was broadcast on ARD.

Famous Kabarett stages in Germany include:
 Die Distel (literally: The Thistle) in Berlin
 Münchner Lach- und Schießgesellschaft (literally: Munich Laugh and Shoot company referring to Wach- und Schließgesellschaft, a security company)
 Leipziger Pfeffermühle (literally: Leipzig pepper mill)
 Herkuleskeule (literally: Herkules' bat) in Dresden
 Kom(m)ödchen in Düsseldorf

Some Kabarett artists in Germany:

Dialect Kabarett: Jürgen Becker (Rhinelandic regiolect), Erwin Pelzig (East Franconian German), Olaf Schubert (Upper Saxon German), Badesalz

Music Kabarett: , Hagen Rether, Malediva

Between classical Kabarett and modern comedy: Eckart von Hirschhausen, Dieter Nuhr

 Third Reich and Neo Nazi references 
The Third Reich, the Nazis, Adolf Hitler and the Neo Nazi scene are often parodied in German humour. Examples are Obersalzberg, a television sketch show, which parodies The Office and Adolf Hitler, portraying Hitler and the Nazis as incompetent, lazy and confused bureaucrats. Front Deutscher Äpfel is a satirical movement to criticise the Neo Nazi scene in Germany.
Harald Schmidt, referring to and criticizing the importance of political correctness in Germany, suggested a Nazometer, a mock measurement device (and causing a minor scandal). The device allegedly will give alarms even for minor Nazi-specific formulations and politically incorrect wording.

 Carnival 

The German traditional carnival includes many humorous and traditional elements. The two major carnival events in Germany are the Mainzer Fastnacht and the Kölner Karneval. These are both in the Rhineland region, but the tradition is practised all over Catholic regions of Germany. It varies with local traditions, but has two main elements:Büttenrede: Gatherings of (often) thousands of people in halls, with humorous readings, music, dancing and drinking. Common themes are puns, satire and roastings of celebrities. These events at the Mainzer Fastnacht and Kölner Karneval are televised across Germany by a major, public television network.Umzüge: Parades in which clubs (musical, sports, etc.), political parties and organizations parade along a given route. The groups dress in traditional clothes or uniforms and/or ride carnival floats, often featuring political or humorous messages.

The televised funny speeches are especially criticised by some, especially the younger generation, as outdated and dull. This cultural gap between generations can be partly explained by the "tradition of tradition", referencing and mocking parts of the tradition itself to create humour. Thus the humour is difficult to understand for outsiders, who grew up with foreign culture and humour, which plays the bigger part in comedies and sitcoms which are broadcast in Germany.

 Humorous dubbing 
One distinct phenomenon of German humour since the emergence of television and the internet is the dubbing or redubbing of foreign language TV series and movies and bringing them into a completely new humorous context or one more humorous than the original. Since American TV series and movies are highly popular in Germany and are almost always dubbed into German, voice actors sooner or later find jokes, wordplays and irony getting lost in translation. Brandt, though, dealt with slang phrases in American movies by not literally translating them, but instead inventing phrases that were funny only in a German language context, thereby considerably altering the meaning of the English version: when the German language did not offer a way to translate both the literal meaning and the humour hidden in it, new jokes and contexts were thought up to maintain the humour rather than the context. As time went on, this style became more and more independent and daring, culminating in the German version of the TV series The Persuaders! being a success in Germany while the English-language version was a flop in the United States. This was due to the vast changes that the program underwent during the German dubbing process, that under Brandt's supervision transformed the show into a much more comedy-oriented spy persiflage contrasting the more subdued, mild humour of the English language original. A quite astounding example of Schnoddersynchron has been performed with Monty Python's Die Ritter der Kokosnuss (that is, Monty Python and the Holy Grail) where the initial dialogue contains phrases such as: Heda! Wer reitet so spät durch Nacht und Wind? ("Hey there! Who rides so late through night and wind?", an obvious reference to Goethe's poem Erlkönig), and Ich habe den Sachsen das Angeln beigebracht, seitdem heißen sie Angelsachsen ("I taught angling to the Saxons, and they've been called Anglo-Saxons ever since") etc. which have no basis whatsoever in the original.

But Schnoddersynchron has become rare nowadays, with primarily comedic programs employing it for practical reasons, like the German dub of Mystery Science Theater 3000's feature film, Mystery Science Theater 3000: The Movie. Because the German dubbing of This Island Earth, the movie spoofed by this film, already varied greatly from the English original, a huge portion of the original jokes commenting on the film became obsolete. To deal with this matter, a group of German comedians (Oliver Kalkofe and Oliver Welke, among others) were assigned to create a dub that better addressed the German version of the spoofed film. This version, therefore, was actually meant to differ in parts from the original text and in consequence was also given the freedom to refer profusely to German culture, like Servo finding an issue of German children's magazine Yps in his room and the group alluding to the music of German organist Franz Lambert during the opening credits. On other occasions, though, puns addressing the films' visuals, or meant for moments in which the English and German text of the original movie actually coincide, were translated literally most of the time, as far as the humour could be transported.

Apart from comedic films and programs, German internet culture has developed the tradition further into so-called Fandubs. A more recent popular example of these fan-made dubs would be the Harry Potter und ein Stein-series, in which the three main protagonists are portrayed as immoral, sexually disoriented teenagers, who are constantly annoyed by their surroundings,  while the teachers either portray a parody on strict and outdated social orders, behave immaturely, or act in a sexually inappropriate way towards children. Another popular example would be the viral internet video , a redub of the first hour of Peter Jackson's The Lord of the Rings: The Fellowship of the Ring, interpreting the pipe smoking Hobbits as drug addicts who go on a journey to find a ring that can produce endless amounts of cannabis. Before Lord of the Weed,  ("Nonesense in Outer Space") mocked Star Trek: The Next Generation in a similar way. The use of local dialects and customs can also be observed here. Occasionally even original German programmes are being redubbed and brought into humorous context, like a TV commercial accompanying the advertising campaign Du bist Deutschland. A later foray of German television into humorous dubbing was the Harald Schmidt Show mocking scenes from Robin Hood: Prince of Thieves that made Robin Hood seem rather ignoble, suggesting in front of his bewildered fellows to stop robbing and raping strong people and rather stick to the weak, sick and disabled, who are easier to assault as they can hardly defend themselves.

 Foreign perception 

In a popular but criticised article in 2006, English comedian Stewart Lee put forward the theory that misconceptions about German humour among English speakers might derive from differences between the English and German languages. In German, new ideas are often named by creating compounds, sometimes resulting in long, quite specific words. Some English-language jokes, according to Lee, do not translate well because German grammar is different from that of English and there is not always a direct translation for a delayed punchline, one of the most common joke formats for English speakers, and such language-based humour. Direct translation is often possible, but is often perceived as artificial, and many puns are lost in translation.

There has been harsh criticism of Lee's views, especially from academics. Linguist Mark Liberman states that in trying to eliminate stereotypes about German humour, Lee himself falls victim to "ethnic prejudice and [...] incoherent linguistic analyses" by basing his "opinions on unsupported and unexamined national stereotypes". Liberman also finds many possibilities for a "pull back and reveal" joke structure in German language.

 See also 
 American humor
 British humour
 East German jokes
 German culture
 Cologne Comedy Festival
 German television comedy
 Kabarett
 List of German language comedians
 Henning Wehn
 Little Erna

 References 

 Further reading 
Pabisch, Peter. "German humor - is there such a thing?." German Life. 01 Apr. 2015: 54. eLibrary. Web. 22 Jul. 2015.
Thomas C. Breuer: Deutschland, ein Ernstfall?, Psychologie Heute, November 2008, p. 36-40

 External links 
 Allo Allo dubbed into German 1 (April 2008)
 Allo Allo dubbed into German 2 (April 2008)
 Stewart Lee, The Guardian, 23 May 2006, "Lost in translation" and a comment on this article in the Language Log
 Chicago based researcher Josh Schonwald on German Humour 
 "It's almost Comedy Central: German humor has ties to the past..."  By Paulette Tobin, published in the Grand Forks Herald, August 22, 1999, page E1

 
Ethnic humour